Simoselaps minimus, also known as the Dampierland burrowing snake, is a species of venomous burrowing snake that is endemic to Australia. The specific epithet minimus (“least”) refers to the species’ relatively small size.

Description
The species grows to an average of about 22 cm in length. It has a pale brown upper body, cream snout, and two black blotches on head and nape.

Behaviour
The species is oviparous.

Distribution and habitat
The species occurs in the Dampierland bioregion of the western Kimberley region of Western Australia, where the characteristic habitat is pindan woodland. The type locality is Broome.

References

 
minimus
Snakes of Australia
Endemic fauna of Australia
Reptiles of Western Australia
Taxa named by Eric Worrell
Reptiles described in 1960